Grimm is a Montenegrin gothic rock-metal band. It was formed in 1999 in Bar, Montenegro. Their first single "Rijeka Moga Sna" (River of My Dreams) was released in 2003. The band also took part in the Serbo-Montenegrin Eurovision Song Contest National Final, Evropesma, in 2006 with "Uspavanka" (Lullaby), and the Montenegrin national finals in 2007 and 2008. The band's lead vocal, Nebojša Đukanović, took part in Montevizija 2005, but did not make it to the final (Evropesma). First band dissolved in 2008, just after their first album has been released, but the band was reestablished as rock duo Grimm, the members being Nebojša Đukanović and Ivana Janković .Since 2015 the band started work on their second album called " Iza Tišine " ( Beyond Silence )

Members 
 Nebojša Đukanović (lead vocal; guitar)
 Ivana Janković (vocal)
Branko Marković (bas)
Marko Šoć (bubnjevi)
Filip Kustudić (lead gitar)

Former members 
 Igor Perović (composer; keyboards)
 Vladimir Popović (drums)
 Dragan Miljanović (solo guitar)
 Darko Mihailović (bass guitar)

Discography 

 Neomeđeni (Muzička Asocijacija Crne Gore 2008)
Iza Tišine  ( Miner records 2016 )

Singles 

 Rijeka Moga Sna
 Uspavanka (Montevizija 2006 / Evropesma 2006)
 Mjeseče (Sunčane Skale 2006)
 Začaran
 Dina
 Kada Ona Ljubi Te (MontenegroSong 2007)
 Vjetar te odnosi 2010 as duo Ivana and Nebojsa Grimm
 Poslednje tkanje 2010 as duo Ivana and Nebojsa Grimm
Igla u oku tvoje duše  2015
Spuštam se  2016
Aquarius 2016

Montenegrin musical groups
Gothic metal musical groups
Musical groups established in 1999
1999 establishments in Montenegro